Wanganella  is a village community on the Billabong Creek in New South Wales, Australia. The settlement is on the Cobb Highway, located between Hay (to the north) and Deniliquin (to the south).  Wanganella is within the Edward River Council local government area.

History
Land was subdivided at Wanganella and in 1864 allotments were sold. A traveller passing through Wanganella in mid-1865 described the township as consisting "of two public houses, a blacksmith’s shop, and a shoemaker’s shop"; he also stated that "a neat bridge" had been erected over Billabong Creek.  Another report from 1865 stated there were twenty-five persons living at Wanganella, which had two inns, two stores and two butchers' shops.

Climate
Climate records have been kept for Wanganella since 1867.

References

External links

Towns in New South Wales
Towns in the Riverina
Edward River Council